Rick Bacon (born 17 January 1955) is a Canadian former volleyball player. He competed in the men's tournament at the 1984 Summer Olympics.

References

External links
 

1955 births
Living people
Canadian men's volleyball players
Olympic volleyball players of Canada
Volleyball players at the 1984 Summer Olympics
People from Windsor, Nova Scotia
Pan American Games medalists in volleyball
Pan American Games bronze medalists for Canada
Medalists at the 1979 Pan American Games